The Abbasid Caliphate was the third caliphate to succeed the Islamic prophet Muhammad. It was founded by a dynasty descended from Muhammad's uncle, Abbas ibn Abd al-Muttalib (566–653 CE), from whom the dynasty takes its name. They ruled as caliphs for most of the caliphate from their capital in Baghdad in modern-day Iraq, after having overthrown the Umayyad Caliphate in the Abbasid Revolution of 750 CE (132 AH). The Abbasid Caliphate first centered its government in Kufa, modern-day Iraq, but in 762 the caliph Al-Mansur founded the city of Baghdad, near the ancient Babylonian capital city of Babylon. Baghdad became the center of science, culture and invention in what became known as the Golden Age of Islam. This, in addition to housing several key academic institutions, including the House of Wisdom, as well as a multiethnic and multi-religious environment, garnered it a worldwide reputation as the "Center of Learning".

The Abbasid period was marked by dependence on Persian bureaucrats (such as the Barmakid family) for governing the territories as well as an increasing inclusion of non-Arab Muslims in the ummah (Muslim community). Persian customs were broadly adopted by the ruling elite, and they began patronage of artists and scholars. Despite this initial cooperation, the Abbasids of the late 8th century had alienated both non-Arab mawali (clients) and Persian bureaucrats. They were forced to cede authority over al-Andalus (current Spain and Portugal) to the Umayyads in 756, Morocco to the Idrisids in 788, Ifriqiya and Sicily to the Aghlabids in 800, Khorasan and Transoxiana to the Samanids and Persia to the Saffarids in the 870s, and Egypt to the Isma'ili-Shia caliphate of the Fatimids in 969.

The political power of the caliphs was limited with the rise of the Iranian Buyids and the Seljuq Turks, who captured Baghdad in 945 and 1055, respectively. Although Abbasid leadership over the vast Islamic empire was gradually reduced to a ceremonial religious function in much of the caliphate, the dynasty retained control of its Mesopotamian domain during the rule of Caliph al-Muqtafi and extended into Iran during the reign of Caliph al-Nasir. The Abbasids' age of cultural revival and fruition ended in 1258 with the sack of Baghdad by the Mongols under Hulagu Khan and the execution of al-Musta'sim. The Abbasid line of rulers, and Muslim culture in general, re-centred themselves in the Mamluk capital of Cairo in 1261. Though lacking in political power (with the brief exception of Caliph al-Musta'in of Cairo), the dynasty continued to claim religious authority until a few years after the Ottoman conquest of Egypt in 1517, with the last Abbasid caliph being Al-Mutawakkil III.

History
The Abbasid caliphs were Arabs descended from Abbas ibn Abd al-Muttalib, one of the youngest uncles of Muhammad and of the same Banu Hashim clan. The Abbasids claimed to be the true successors of Muhammad in replacing the Umayyad descendants of Banu Umayya by virtue of their closer bloodline to Muhammad.

Abbasid Revolution (750–751)

The Abbasids also distinguished themselves from the Umayyads by attacking their moral character and administration in general. According to Ira Lapidus, "The Abbasid revolt was supported largely by Arabs, mainly the aggrieved settlers of Merv with the addition of the Yemeni faction and their Mawali". The Abbasids also appealed to non-Arab Muslims, known as mawali, who remained outside the kinship-based society of the Arabs and were perceived as a lower class within the Umayyad empire. Muhammad ibn 'Ali, a great-grandson of Abbas, began to campaign in Persia for the return of power to the family of Muhammad, the Hashemites, during the reign of Umar II.

Supported by the province of Khorasan (Eastern Persia), even though the governor opposed them, and the Shia Arabs, he achieved considerable success, but was captured in the year 747 and died, possibly assassinated, in prison.

On 9 June 747 (15 Ramadan AH 129), Abu Muslim, rising from Khorasan, successfully initiated an open revolt against Umayyad rule, which was carried out under the sign of the Black Standard. Close to 10,000 soldiers were under Abu Muslim's command when the hostilities officially began in Merv. General Qahtaba followed the fleeing governor Nasr ibn Sayyar west defeating the Umayyads at the Battle of Gorgan, the Battle of Nahāvand and finally in the Battle of Karbala, all in the year 748.

The quarrel was taken up by Ibrahim's brother Abdallah, known by the name of Abu al-'Abbas as-Saffah, who defeated the Umayyads in 750 in the battle near the Great Zab and was subsequently proclaimed caliph. After this loss, Marwan fled to Egypt, where he was subsequently killed. The remainder of his family, barring one male, were also eliminated.

Power (752–775)

Immediately after their victory, as-Saffah sent his forces to Central Asia, where his forces fought against Tang expansion during the Battle of Talas. The noble Iranian family Barmakids, who were instrumental in building Baghdad, introduced the world's first recorded paper mill in the city, thus beginning a new era of intellectual rebirth in the Abbasid domain. As-Saffah focused on putting down numerous rebellions in Syria and Mesopotamia. The Byzantines conducted raids during these early distractions.

The first change made by the Abbasids under al-Mansur was to move the empire's capital from Damascus to a newly founded city. Established on the Tigris River in 762, Baghdad was closer to the Persian mawali support base of the Abbasids, and this move addressed their demand for less Arab dominance in the empire. A new position, that of the wazir, was also established to delegate central authority, and even greater authority was delegated to local emirs. Al-Mansur centralised the judicial administration, and later, Harun al-Rashid established the institution of Chief Qadi to oversee it.

This resulted in a more ceremonial role for many Abbasid caliphs relative to their time under the Umayyads; the viziers began to exert greater influence, and the role of the old Arab aristocracy was slowly replaced by a Persian bureaucracy. During Al-Mansur's time, control of Al-Andalus was lost, and the Shia revolted and were defeated a year later at the Battle of Bakhamra.

The Abbasids had depended heavily on the support of Persians in their overthrow of the Umayyads. Abu al-'Abbas' successor Al-Mansur welcomed non-Arab Muslims to his court. While this helped integrate Arab and Persian cultures, it alienated many of their Arab supporters, particularly the Khorasanian Arabs who had supported them in their battles against the Umayyads. This fissure in support led to immediate problems. The Umayyads, while out of power, were not destroyed; the only surviving member of the Umayyad royal family ultimately made his way to Spain where he established himself as an independent Emir (Abd al-Rahman I, 756). In 929, Abd al-Rahman III assumed the title of Caliph, establishing Al-Andalus from Córdoba as a rival to Baghdad as the legitimate capital of the Islamic Empire.

The Umayyad empire was mostly Arab; however, the Abbasids progressively became made up of more and more converted Muslims in which the Arabs were only one of many ethnicities.

In 756, Al-Mansur sent over 4,000 Arab mercenaries to assist the Chinese Tang dynasty in the An Lushan Rebellion against An Lushan. The Abbasids, or "Black Flags" as they were commonly called, were known in Tang dynasty chronicles as the hēiyī Dàshí, "The Black-robed Tazi" ("Tazi" being a borrowing from Persian Tāzī, the word for "Arab"). Al-Rashid sent embassies to the Chinese Tang dynasty and established good relations with them. After the war, these embassies remained in China with Caliph Harun al-Rashid establishing an alliance with China. Several embassies from the Abbasid Caliphs to the Chinese court have been recorded in the T'ang Annals, the most important of these being those of Abul Abbas al-Saffah, the first Abbasid caliph; his successor Abu Jafar; and Harun al-Rashid.

Abbasid Golden Age (775–861)
The Abbasid leadership had to work hard in the last half of the 8th century (750–800) under several competent caliphs and their viziers to usher in the administrative changes needed to keep order of the political challenges created by the far-flung nature of the empire, and the limited communication across it. It was also during this early period of the dynasty, in particular during the governance of Al-Mansur, Harun al-Rashid, and al-Ma'mun, that its reputation and power were created.

Al-Mahdi restarted the fighting with the Byzantines, and his sons continued the conflict until Empress Irene pushed for peace. After several years of peace, Nikephoros I broke the treaty, then fended off multiple incursions during the first decade of the 9th century. These attacks pushed into the Taurus Mountains, culminating with a victory at the Battle of Krasos and the massive invasion of 806, led by Rashid himself.

Rashid's navy also proved successful, taking Cyprus. Rashid decided to focus on the rebellion of Rafi ibn al-Layth in Khorasan and died while there. Military operations by the caliphate were minimal while the Byzantine Empire was fighting Abbasid rule in Syria and Anatolia, with focus shifting primarily to internal matters; Abbasid governors exerted greater autonomy and, using this increasing power, began to make their positions hereditary.

At the same time, the Abbasids faced challenges closer to home. Harun al-Rashid turned on and killed most of the Barmakids, a Persian family that had grown significantly in administrative power. During the same period, several factions began either to leave the empire for other lands or to take control of distant parts of the empire. Still, the reigns of al-Rashid and his sons were considered to be the apex of the Abbasids.

After Rashid's death, the empire was split by a civil war between the caliph al-Amin and his brother al-Ma'mun, who had the support of Khorasan. This war ended with a two-year siege of Baghdad and the eventual death of Al-Amin in 813. Al-Ma'mun ruled for 20 years of relative calm interspersed with a rebellion in Azerbaijan by the Khurramites, which was supported by the Byzantines. Al-Ma'mun was also responsible for the creation of an autonomous Khorasan, and the continued repulsing of Byzantine forays.

Al-Mu'tasim gained power in 833 and his rule marked the end of the strong caliphs. He strengthened his personal army with Turkish mercenaries and promptly restarted the war with the Byzantines. Though his attempt to seize Constantinople failed when his fleet was destroyed by a storm, his military excursions were generally successful, culminating with a resounding victory in the Sack of Amorium. The Byzantines responded by sacking Damietta in Egypt, and Al-Mutawakkil responded by sending his troops into Anatolia again, sacking and marauding until they were eventually annihilated in 863.

Mamluks 
In the 9th century, the Abbasids created an army loyal only to their caliphate, composed of non-Arab origin people, known as Mamluks. This force, created in the reign of al-Ma'mun (813–833) and his brother and successor al-Mu'tasim (833–842), prevented the further disintegration of the empire. The Mamluk army, though often viewed negatively, both helped and hurt the caliphate. Early on, it provided the government with a stable force to address domestic and foreign problems. However, creation of this foreign army and al-Mu'tasim's transfer of the capital from Baghdad to Samarra created a division between the caliphate and the peoples they claimed to rule.

Fracture to autonomous dynasties (861–945)

Even by 820, the Samanids had begun the process of exercising independent authority in Transoxiana and Greater Khorasan, and the succeeding 
Saffarid dynasty of Iran. The Saffarids, from Khorasan, nearly seized Baghdad in 876, and the Tulunids took control of most of Syria. The trend of weakening of the central power and strengthening of the minor caliphates on the periphery continued.

An exception was the 10-year period of Al-Mu'tadid's rule (r. 892–902). He brought parts of Egypt, Syria, and Khorasan back into Abbasid control. Especially after the "Anarchy at Samarra" (861–870), the Abbasid central government was weakened and centrifugal tendencies became more prominent in the caliphate's provinces. By the early 10th century, the Abbasids almost lost control of Iraq to various amirs, and the caliph al-Radi (934–941) was forced to acknowledge their power by creating the position of "Prince of Princes" (amir al-umara). In addition, the power of the Mamluks steadily grew, reaching a climax when al-Radi was constrained to hand over most of the royal functions to the non-Arab Muhammad ibn Ra'iq.

Al-Mustakfi had a short reign from 944 to 946, and it was during this period that the Persian faction known as the Buyids from Daylam swept into power and assumed control over the bureaucracy in Baghdad. According to the history of Miskawayh, they began distributing iqtas (fiefs in the form of tax farms) to their supporters. This period of localized secular control was to last nearly 100 years. The loss of Abbasid power to the Buyids would shift as the Seljuks would take over from the Persians.

At the end of the eighth century, the Abbasids found they could no longer keep together a polity from Baghdad, which had grown larger than that of Rome. In 793 the Zaydi-Shia dynasty of Idrisids set up a state from Fez in Morocco, while a family of governors under the Abbasids became increasingly independent until they founded the Aghlabid Emirate from the 830s. Al-Mu'tasim started the downward slide by utilizing non-Muslim mercenaries in his personal army. Also during this period, officers started assassinating superiors with whom they disagreed, in particular the caliphs.

By the 870s, Egypt became autonomous under Ahmad ibn Tulun. In the East, governors decreased their ties to the center as well. The Saffarids of Herat and the Samanids of Bukhara began breaking away around this time, cultivating a much more Persianate culture and statecraft. Only the central lands of Mesopotamia were under direct Abbasid control, with Palestine and the Hijaz often managed by the Tulunids. Byzantium, for its part, had begun to push Arab Muslims farther east in Anatolia.

By the 920s, North Africa was lost to the Fatimid dynasty, a Shia sect tracing its roots to Muhammad's daughter Fatimah. The Fatimid dynasty took control of Idrisid and Aghlabid domains, advanced to Egypt in 969, and established their capital near Fustat in Cairo, which they built as a bastion of Shia learning and politics. By 1000 they had become the chief political and ideological challenge to Sunni Islam and the Abbasids, who by this time had fragmented into several governorships that, while recognizing caliphal authority from Baghdad, remained mostly autonomous. The caliph himself was under 'protection' of the Buyid Emirs who possessed all of Iraq and Western Iran, and were quietly Shia in their sympathies.

Outside Iraq, all the autonomous provinces slowly took on the characteristic of de facto states with hereditary rulers, armies, and revenues and operated under only nominal caliph suzerainty, which may not necessarily be reflected by any contribution to the treasury, such as the Soomro Emirs that had gained control of Sindh and ruled the entire province from their capital of Mansura. Mahmud of Ghazni took the title of sultan, as opposed to the "amir" that had been in more common usage, signifying the Ghaznavid Empire's independence from caliphal authority, despite Mahmud's ostentatious displays of Sunni orthodoxy and ritual submission to the caliph. In the 11th century, the loss of respect for the caliphs continued, as some Islamic rulers no longer mentioned the caliph's name in the Friday khutba, or struck it off their coinage.

The Isma'ili Fatimid dynasty of Cairo contested the Abbasids for the titular authority of the Islamic ummah. They commanded some support in the Shia sections of Baghdad (such as Karkh), although Baghdad was the city most closely connected to the caliphate, even in the Buyid and Seljuq eras. The challenge of the Fatimids only ended with their downfall in the 12th century.

Buyid and Seljuq control (945–1118)

Despite the power of the Buyid amirs, the Abbasids retained a highly ritualized court in Baghdad, as described by the Buyid bureaucrat Hilal al-Sabi', and they retained a certain influence over Baghdad as well as religious life. As Buyid power waned with the rule of Baha' al-Daula, the caliphate was able to regain some measure of strength. The caliph al-Qadir, for example, led the ideological struggle against the Shia with writings such as the Baghdad Manifesto. The caliphs kept order in Baghdad itself, attempting to prevent the outbreak of fitnas in the capital, often contending with the ayyarun.

With the Buyid dynasty on the wane, a vacuum was created that was eventually filled by the dynasty of Oghuz Turks known as the Seljuqs. By 1055, the Seljuqs had wrested control from the Buyids and Abbasids, and took temporal power. When the amir and former slave Basasiri took up the Shia Fatimid banner in Baghdad in 1056–57, the caliph al-Qa'im was unable to defeat him without outside help. Toghril Beg, the Seljuq sultan, restored Baghdad to Sunni rule and took Iraq for his dynasty.

Once again, the Abbasids were forced to deal with a military power that they could not match, though the Abbasid caliph remained the titular head of the Islamic community. The succeeding sultans Alp Arslan and Malikshah, as well as their vizier Nizam al-Mulk, took up residence in Persia, but held power over the Abbasids in Baghdad. When the dynasty began to weaken in the 12th century, the Abbasids gained greater independence once again.

Revival of military strength (1118–1258)

While the caliph al-Mustarshid was the first caliph to build an army capable of meeting a Seljuk army in battle, he was nonetheless defeated and assassinated in 1135. The caliph al-Muqtafi was the first Abbasid Caliph to regain the full military independence of the caliphate, with the help of his vizier Ibn Hubayra. After nearly 250 years of subjection to foreign dynasties, he successfully defended Baghdad against the Seljuqs in the siege of Baghdad (1157), thus securing Iraq for the Abbasids. The reign of al-Nasir (d. 1225) brought the caliphate back into power throughout Iraq, based in large part on the Sufi futuwwa organizations that the caliph headed. Al-Mustansir built the Mustansiriya School, in an attempt to eclipse the Seljuq-era Nizamiyya built by Nizam al Mulk.

Mongol invasion and end 

In 1206, Genghis Khan established a powerful dynasty among the Mongols of central Asia. During the 13th century, this Mongol Empire conquered most of the Eurasian land mass, including both China in the east and much of the old Islamic caliphate (as well as Kievan Rus') in the west. Hulagu Khan's destruction of Baghdad in 1258 is traditionally seen as the approximate end of the Golden Age. 

Contemporary accounts state Mongol soldiers looted and then destroyed mosques, palaces, libraries, and hospitals. Priceless books from Baghdad's thirty-six public libraries were torn apart, the looters using their leather covers as sandals. Grand buildings that had been the work of generations were burned to the ground. The House of Wisdom (the Grand Library of Baghdad), containing countless precious historical documents and books on subjects ranging from medicine to astronomy, was destroyed. Claims have been made that the Tigris ran red from the blood of the scientists and philosophers killed. Citizens attempted to flee, but were intercepted by Mongol soldiers who killed in abundance, sparing no one, not even children.

The caliph Al-Musta'sim was captured and forced to watch as his citizens were murdered and his treasury plundered. Ironically, Mongols feared that a supernatural disaster would strike if the blood of Al-Musta'sim, a direct descendant of Muhammad's uncle Abbas ibn Abd al-Muttalib, and the last reigning Abbasid caliph in Baghdad, was spilled. The Shia of Persia stated that no such calamity had happened after the death of Husayn ibn Ali in the Battle of Karbala; nevertheless, as a precaution and in accordance with a Mongol taboo which forbade spilling royal blood, Hulagu had Al-Musta'sim wrapped in a carpet and trampled to death by horses on 20 February 1258. The caliph's immediate family was also executed, with the lone exceptions of his youngest son who was sent to Mongolia, and a daughter who became a slave in the harem of Hulagu.

Abbasid Caliphate of Cairo (1261–1517) 

Similarly to how a Mamluk Army was created by the Abbasids, a Mamluk Army was created by the Egypt-based Ayyubid dynasty. These Mamluks decided to directly overthrow their masters and came to power in 1250 in what is known as the Mamluk Sultanate. In 1261, following the devastation of Baghdad by the Mongols, the Mamluk rulers of Egypt re-established the Abbasid caliphate in Cairo. The first Abbasid caliph of Cairo was Al-Mustansir. The Abbasid caliphs in Egypt continued to maintain the presence of authority, but it was confined to religious matters. The Abbasid caliphate of Cairo lasted until the time of Al-Mutawakkil III, who was taken away as a prisoner by Selim I to Constantinople where he had a ceremonial role. He died in 1543, following his return to Cairo.

Culture

Islamic Golden Age

The Abbasid historical period lasting to the Mongol conquest of Baghdad in 1258 CE is considered the Islamic Golden Age. The Islamic Golden Age was inaugurated by the middle of the 8th century by the ascension of the Abbasid Caliphate and the transfer of the capital from Damascus to Baghdad. The Abbasids were influenced by the Qur'anic injunctions and hadith, such as "the ink of a scholar is more holy than the blood of a martyr", stressing the value of knowledge. During this period the Muslim world became an intellectual center for science, philosophy, medicine and education as the Abbasids championed the cause of knowledge and established the House of Wisdom in Baghdad, where both Muslim and non-Muslim scholars sought to translate and gather all the world's knowledge into Arabic. Many classic works of antiquity that would otherwise have been lost were translated into Arabic and Persian and later in turn translated into Turkish, Hebrew and Latin. During this period the Muslim world was a cauldron of cultures which collected, synthesized and significantly advanced the knowledge gained from the Roman, Chinese, Indian, Persian, Egyptian, North African, Ancient Greek and Medieval Greek civilizations. According to Huff, "[i]n virtually every field of endeavor—in astronomy, alchemy, mathematics, medicine, optics and so forth—the Caliphate's scientists were in the forefront of scientific advance."

Science

The reigns of Harun al-Rashid (786–809) and his successors fostered an age of great intellectual achievement. In large part, this was the result of the schismatic forces that had undermined the Umayyad regime, which relied on the assertion of the superiority of Arab culture as part of its claim to legitimacy, and the Abbasids' welcoming of support from non-Arab Muslims. It is well established that the Abbasid caliphs modeled their administration on that of the Sassanids. Harun al-Rashid's son, Al-Ma'mun (whose mother was Persian), is even quoted as saying:

A number of medieval thinkers and scientists living under Islamic rule played a role in transmitting Islamic science to the Christian West. In addition, the period saw the recovery of much of the Alexandrian mathematical, geometric and astronomical knowledge, such as that of Euclid and Claudius Ptolemy. These recovered mathematical methods were later enhanced and developed by other Islamic scholars, notably by Persian scientists Al-Biruni and Abu Nasr Mansur.

Christians (particularly Nestorian Christians) contributed to the Arab Islamic Civilization during the Umayyads and the Abbasids by translating works of Greek philosophers to Syriac and afterwards to Arabic. Nestorians played a prominent role in the formation of Arab culture, with the Academy of Gondishapur being prominent in the late Sassanid, Umayyad and early Abbasid periods. Notably, eight generations of the Nestorian Bukhtishu family served as private doctors to caliphs and sultans between the eighth and eleventh centuries.

Algebra was significantly developed by Persian scientist Muhammad ibn Mūsā al-Khwārizmī during this time in his landmark text, Kitab al-Jabr wa-l-Muqabala, from which the term algebra is derived. He is thus considered to be the father of algebra by some, although the Greek mathematician Diophantus has also been given this title. The terms algorism and algorithm are derived from the name of al-Khwarizmi, who was also responsible for introducing the Arabic numerals and Hindu–Arabic numeral system beyond the Indian subcontinent.

Arab scientist Ibn al-Haytham (Alhazen) developed an early scientific method in his Book of Optics (1021). The most important development of the scientific method was the use of experiments to distinguish between competing scientific theories set within a generally empirical orientation, which began among Muslim scientists. Ibn al-Haytham's empirical proof of the intromission theory of light (that is, that light rays entered the eyes rather than being emitted by them) was particularly important. Alhazen was significant in the history of scientific method, particularly in his approach to experimentation, and has been referred to as the "world's first true scientist".

Medicine in medieval Islam was an area of science that advanced particularly during the Abbasids' reign. During the 9th century, Baghdad contained over 800 doctors, and great discoveries in the understanding of anatomy and diseases were made. The clinical distinction between measles and smallpox was described during this time. Famous Persian scientist Ibn Sina (known to the West as Avicenna) produced treatises and works that summarized the vast amount of knowledge that scientists had accumulated, and was very influential through his encyclopedias, The Canon of Medicine and The Book of Healing. The work of him and many others directly influenced the research of European scientists during the Renaissance.

Astronomy in medieval Islam was advanced by Al-Battani, who improved the precision of the measurement of the precession of the Earth's axis. The corrections made to the geocentric model by al-Battani, Averroes, Nasir al-Din al-Tusi, Mo'ayyeduddin Urdi and Ibn al-Shatir were later incorporated into the Copernican heliocentric model. The astrolabe, though originally developed by the Greeks, was developed further by Islamic astronomers and engineers, and subsequently brought to medieval Europe.

Muslim alchemists influenced medieval European alchemists, particularly the writings attributed to Jābir ibn Hayyān (Geber).

Literature

The best-known fiction from the Islamic world is One Thousand and One Nights, a collection of fantastical folk tales, legends and parables compiled primarily during the Abbasid era. The collection is recorded as having originated from an Arabic translation of a Sassanian era Persian prototype, with likely origins in Indian literary traditions. Stories from Arabic, Persian, Mesopotamian, and Egyptian folklore and literature were later incorporated. The epic is believed to have taken shape in the 10th century and reached its final form by the 14th century; the number and type of tales have varied from one manuscript to another. All Arabian fantasy tales were often called "Arabian Nights" when translated into English, regardless of whether they appeared in The Book of One Thousand and One Nights. This epic has been influential in the West since it was translated in the 18th century, first by Antoine Galland. Many imitations were written, especially in France. Various characters from this epic have themselves become cultural icons in Western culture, such as Aladdin, Sinbad and Ali Baba.

A famous example of Islamic poetry on romance was Layla and Majnun, an originally Arabic story which was further developed by Iranian, Azerbaijani and other poets in the Persian, Azerbaijani, and Turkish languages. It is a tragic story of undying love much like the later Romeo and Juliet.

Arabic poetry reached its greatest height in the Abbasid era, especially before the loss of central authority and the rise of the Persianate dynasties. Writers like Abu Tammam and Abu Nuwas were closely connected to the caliphal court in Baghdad during the early 9th century, while others such as al-Mutanabbi received their patronage from regional courts.

Under Harun al-Rashid, Baghdad was renowned for its bookstores, which proliferated after the making of paper was introduced. Chinese papermakers had been among those taken prisoner by the Arabs at the Battle of Talas in 751. As prisoners of war, they were dispatched to Samarkand, where they helped set up the first Arab paper mill. In time, paper replaced parchment as the medium for writing, and the production of books greatly increased. These events had an academic and societal impact that could be broadly compared to the introduction of the printing press in the West. Paper aided in communication and record-keeping, it also brought a new sophistication and complexity to businesses, banking, and the civil service. In 794, Jafa al-Barmak built the first paper mill in Baghdad, and from there the technology circulated. Harun required that paper be employed in government dealings, since something recorded on paper could not easily be changed or removed, and eventually, an entire street in Baghdad's business district was dedicated to selling paper and books.

Philosophy

One of the common definitions for "Islamic philosophy" is "the style of philosophy produced within the framework of Islamic culture." Islamic philosophy, in this definition is neither necessarily concerned with religious issues, nor is exclusively produced by Muslims. Their works on Aristotle were a key step in the transmission of learning from ancient Greeks to the Islamic world and the West. They often corrected the philosopher, encouraging a lively debate in the spirit of ijtihad. They also wrote influential original philosophical works, and their thinking was incorporated into Christian philosophy during the Middle Ages, notably by Thomas Aquinas.

Three speculative thinkers, al-Kindi, al-Farabi, and Avicenna, combined Aristotelianism and Neoplatonism with other ideas introduced through Islam, and Avicennism was later established as a result. Other influential Abbasid philosophers include al-Jahiz, and Ibn al-Haytham (Alhacen).

Architecture

As power shifted from the Umayyads to the Abbasids, the architectural styles changed also, from Greco-Roman tradition (which features elements of Hellenistic and Roman representative style) to Eastern tradition which retained their independent architectural traditions from Mesopotamia and Persia. The Abbasid architecture was particularly influenced by Sasanian architecture, which in turn featured elements present since ancient Mesopotamia. The Christian styles evolved into a style based more on the Sasanian Empire, utilizing mud bricks and baked bricks with carved stucco. Another major development was the creation or vast enlargement of cities as they were turned into the capital of the empire, beginning with the creation of Baghdad in 762, which was planned as a walled city with four gates, and a mosque and palace in the center. Al-Mansur, who was responsible for the creation of Baghdad, also planned the city of Raqqa, along the Euphrates. Finally, in 836, al-Mu'tasim moved the capital to a new site that he created along the Tigris, called Samarra. This city saw 60 years of work, with race-courses and game preserves to add to the atmosphere. Due to the dry remote nature of the environment, some of the palaces built in this era were isolated havens. Al-Ukhaidir Fortress is a fine example of this type of building, which has stables, living quarters, and a mosque, all surrounding inner courtyards. Other mosques of this era, such as the Great Mosque of Kairouan in Tunisia, while ultimately built during the Umayyad dynasty, were substantially renovated in the 9th century. These renovations, so extensive as to ostensibly be rebuilds, were in the furthest reaches of the Muslim world, in an area that the Aghlabids controlled; however, the styles utilized were mainly Abbasid. In Egypt, Ahmad Ibn Tulun commissioned the Ibn Tulun Mosque, completed in 879, that is based on the style of Samarra and is now one of the best-preserved Abbasid-style mosques from this period. Mesopotamia only has one surviving mausoleum from this era, in Samarra. This octagonal dome is the final resting place of al-Muntasir. Other architectural innovations and styles were few, such as the four-centered arch, and a dome erected on squinches. Unfortunately, much was lost due to the ephemeral nature of the stucco and luster tiles.

Foundation of Baghdad 
The caliph al-Mansur founded the epicenter of the empire, Baghdad, in 762 CE, as a means of disassociating his dynasty from that of the preceding Umayyads (centered at Damascus) and the rebellious cities of Kufa and Basrah. Mesopotamia was an ideal locale for a capital city due to its high agricultural output, access to the Euphrates and Tigris Rivers (allowing for trade and communication across the region), central locale between the corners of the vast empire (stretching from Egypt to Afghanistan) and access to the Silk Road and Indian Ocean trade routes, all key reasons as to why the region has hosted important capital cities such as Ur, Babylon, Nineveh and Ctesiphon and was later desired by the British Empire as an outpost by which to maintain access to India. The city was organized in a circular fashion next to the Tigris River, with massive brick walls being constructed in successive rings around the core by a workforce of 100,000 with four huge gates (named Kufa, Basrah, Khorasan and Syria). Travel across the Tigris and the network of waterways allowing the drainage of the Euphrates into the Tigris was facilitated by bridges and canals servicing the population.

Glass and crystal
The Near East has, since Roman times, been recognized as a center of quality glassware and crystal. 9th-century finds from Samarra show styles similar to Sassanian forms. The types of objects made were bottles, flasks, vases, and cups intended for domestic use, with decorations including molded flutes, honeycomb patterns, and inscriptions. Other styles seen that may not have come from the Sassanians were stamped items. These were typically round stamps, such as medallions or disks with animals, birds, or Kufic inscriptions. Colored lead glass, typically blue or green, has been found in Nishapur, along with prismatic perfume bottles. Finally, cut glass may have been the high point of Abbasid glass-working, decorated with floral and animal designs.

Painting

Early Abbasid painting has not survived in great quantities, and is sometimes harder to differentiate; however, Samarra provides good examples, as it was built by the Abbasids and abandoned 56 years later. The walls of the principal rooms of the palace that have been excavated show wall paintings and lively carved stucco dadoes. The style is obviously adopted with little variation from Sassanian art, bearing not only similar styles, with harems, animals, and dancing people, all enclosed in scrollwork, but the garments are also Persian. Nishapur had its own school of painting. Excavations at Nishapur show both monochromatic and polychromatic artwork from the 8th and 9th centuries. One famous piece of art consists of hunting nobles with falcons and on horseback, in full regalia; the clothing identifies them as Tahirid, which was, again, a sub-dynasty of the Abbasids. Other styles are of vegetation, and fruit in nice colors on a four-foot high dedo.

Pottery

Whereas painting and architecture were not areas of strength for the Abbasid dynasty, pottery was a different story. Islamic culture as a whole, and the Abbasids in particular, were at the forefront of new ideas and techniques. Some examples of their work were pieces engraved with decorations and then colored with yellow-brown, green, and purple glazes. Designs were diverse with geometric patterns, Kufic lettering, and arabesque scrollwork, along with rosettes, animals, birds, and humans. Abbasid pottery from the 8th and 9th centuries has been found throughout the region, as far as Cairo. These were generally made with a yellow clay and fired multiple times with separate glazes to produce metallic luster in shades of gold, brown, or red. By the 9th century, the potters had mastered their techniques and their decorative designs could be divided into two styles. The Persian style would show animals, birds, and humans, along with Kufic lettering in gold. Pieces excavated from Samarra exceed in vibrancy and beauty any from later periods. These predominantly being made for the caliph's use. Tiles were also made using this same technique to create both monochromatic and polychromatic lusterware tiles.

Textiles
Egypt being a center of the textile industry was part of Abbasid cultural advancement. Copts were employed in the textile industry and produced linens and silks. Tinnis was famous for its factories and had over 5,000 looms. Examples of textiles were kasab, a fine linen for turbans, and badana for upper-class garments. The kiswah for the kaaba in Mecca was made in a town named Tuna near Tinnis. Fine silk was also made in Dabik and Damietta. Of particular interest are stamped and inscribed fabrics, which used not only inks but also liquid gold. Some of the finer pieces were colored in such a manner as to require six separate stamps to achieve the proper design and color. This technology spread to Europe eventually.

Clothing 

The Abbasid period saw a large fashion development throughout it's existence. While the development of fashion began during the Umayyad period, its genuine cosmopolitan styles and influence were realized at their finest during Abbasid rule. Fashion was a thriving industry during the Abbasid period that was also strictly regulated either by law or through the accepted elements of style. Among the higher classes, appearance became a concern and they started to care about appearance and fashion. Several new garments and fabrics were introduced into common use and no longer observed pious distaste for materials such as silk and satins. The rise of the Persian secretarial class had a large influence over the development of fashion and the Abbasids were highly influenced by the older Persian Court dress elements. For example, the caliph al-Muʿtasim was reportedly notable for his desire to imitate Persian kings by wearing a turban over a soft cap which was later adopted by other Abbasid rulers and called it the "muʿtasimi" in his honor.

The Abbasids wore many layers of garments. Fabrics used for the clothing seemed to have included wool, linen, brocades, or silk the clothing of the poorer classes was made out of cheaper materials, such as wool, and had less fabric. This also meant they wouldn't be able to afford the variety of garments that the elite classes wore. Elegant women would not wear black, green, red, or pink, except for fabrics that naturally had those colors, such as red silk. Women’s clothing would be perfumed with musk, sandalwood, hyacinth or ambergris, but no other scents. Footwear included furry Cambay shoes, boots of the style of Persian ladies, and curved shoes.

Caliph al-Mansur was credited with making his court and the Abbasid high-ranking officials wear honorific robes of the color black for various ceremonial affairs and events which became the official color of the caliphate. This was acknowledged in China and Byzantium who called the Abbasids the "black-robed ones." But despite the color black being common during the caliphate, many color dyes existed and it was made sure that colors would not clash. Notably, the color yellow needed to be avoided when wearing colored clothing.

Abbasid Caliphs wore elegant kaftans, a Persian robe made from silver or gold brocade and buttons in the front of the sleeves. Caliph al-Muqtaddir wore a kaftan from silver brocade Tustari silk and his son one made from Byzantine silk richly decorated or ornamented with figures. The kaftan was spread far and wide by the Abbasids and made known throughout the Arab world. In the 830s, Emperor Theophilus, went about à l'arabe in kaftans and turbans. Even as far as the streets of Ghuangzhou during the era of Tang dynasty, the Persian kaftan was in fashion.

Technology

In technology, the Abbasids adopted papermaking from China. The use of paper spread from China into the caliphate in the 8th century CE, arriving in al-Andalus (Islamic Spain) and then the rest of Europe in the 10th century. It was easier to manufacture than parchment, less likely to crack than papyrus, and could absorb ink, making it ideal for making records and copies of the Qur'an. "Islamic paper makers devised assembly-line methods of hand-copying manuscripts to turn out editions far larger than any available in Europe for centuries." It was from the Abbasids that the rest of the world learned to make paper from linen. The knowledge of gunpowder was also transmitted from China via the caliphate, where the formulas for pure potassium nitrate and an explosive gunpowder effect were first developed.

Advances were made in irrigation and farming, using new technology such as the windmill. Crops such as almonds and citrus fruit were brought to Europe through al-Andalus, and sugar cultivation was gradually adopted by the Europeans. Apart from the Nile, Tigris and Euphrates, navigable rivers were uncommon, so transport by sea was very important. Navigational sciences were highly developed, making use of a rudimentary sextant (known as a kamal). When combined with detailed maps of the period, sailors were able to sail across oceans rather than skirt along the coast. Abbasid sailors were also responsible for reintroducing large three masted merchant vessels to the Mediterranean. The name caravel may derive from an earlier Arab ship known as the qārib. Arab merchants dominated trade in the Indian Ocean until the arrival of the Portuguese in the 16th century. Hormuz was an important center for this trade. There was also a dense network of trade routes in the Mediterranean, along which Muslim countries traded with each other and with European powers such as Venice or Genoa. The Silk Road crossing Central Asia passed through the Abbasid caliphate between China and Europe.

Engineers in the Abbasid caliphate made a number of innovative industrial uses of hydropower, and early industrial uses of tidal power, wind power, and petroleum (notably by distillation into kerosene). The industrial uses of watermills in the Islamic world date back to the 7th century, while horizontal-wheeled and vertical-wheeled water mills were both in widespread use since at least the 9th century. By the time of the Crusades, every province throughout the Islamic world had mills in operation, from al-Andalus and North Africa to the Middle East and Central Asia. These mills performed a variety of agricultural and industrial tasks. Abbasid engineers also developed machines (such as pumps) incorporating crankshafts, employed gears in mills and water-raising machines, and used dams to provide additional power to watermills and water-raising machines. Such advances made it possible for many industrial tasks that were previously driven by manual labour in ancient times to be mechanized and driven by machinery instead in the medieval Islamic world. It has been argued that the industrial use of waterpower had spread from Islamic to Christian Spain, where fulling mills, paper mills, and forge mills were recorded for the first time in Catalonia.

A number of industries were generated during the Arab Agricultural Revolution, including early industries for textiles, sugar, rope-making, matting, silk, and paper. Latin translations of the 12th century passed on knowledge of chemistry and instrument making in particular. The agricultural and handicraft industries also experienced high levels of growth during this period.

Status of women

In contrast to the earlier era, women in Abbasid society were absent from all arenas of the community's central affairs. While their Muslim forbears led men into battle, started rebellions, and played an active role in community life, as demonstrated in the Hadith literature, Abbasid women were ideally kept in seclusion. Conquests had brought enormous wealth and large numbers of slaves to the Muslim elite. The majority of the slaves were women and children, many of whom had been dependents or harem-members of the defeated Sassanian upper classes. In the wake of the conquests an elite man could potentially own a thousand slaves, and ordinary soldiers could have ten people serving them.

It was narrated from Ibn Abbas that Muhammad said:

Even so, slave courtesans (qiyans and jawaris) and princesses produced prestigious and important poetry. Enough survives to give us access to women's historical experiences, and reveals some vivacious and powerful figures, such as the Sufi mystic Raabi'a al-Adwiyya (714–801 CE), the princess and poet 'Ulayya bint al-Mahdi (777–825 CE), and the singing-girls Shāriyah (–870 CE), Fadl Ashsha'ira (d. 871 CE) and Arib al-Ma'muniyya (797–890 CE).

Each wife in the Abbasid harem had an additional home or flat, with her own enslaved staff of eunuchs and maidservants. When a concubine gave birth to a son, she was elevated in rank to umm walad and also received apartments and (slave) servants as a gift.

Treatment of Jews and Christians 

The status and treatment of Jews, Christians, and non-Muslims in the Abbasid Caliphate was a complex and continually changing issue. Non-Muslims were called dhimmis. Dhimmis did not have all of the privileges that Muslims had and commonly had to pay jizya, a tax for not being a Muslim. One of the common aspects of the treatment of the dhimmis is that their treatment depended on who the caliph was at the time. Some Abbasid rulers, like Al-Mutawakkil (822–861 CE) imposed strict restrictions on what dhimmis could wear in public, often yellow garments that distinguished them from Muslims. Other restrictions al-Mutawakkil imposed included limiting the role of the dhimmis in government, seizing dhimmi housing and making it harder for dhimmis to become educated. Most other Abbasid caliphs were not as strict as al-Mutawakkil, though. During the reign of Al-Mansur (714–775 CE), it was common for Jews and Christians to influence the overall culture in the caliphate, specifically in Baghdad. Jews and Christians did this by participating in scholarly work.

It was common that laws that were imposed against dhimmis during one caliph's rule were either discarded or not practiced during future caliphs' reigns. Al-Mansur and al-Mutawakkil both instituted laws that forbade non-Muslims from participating in public office. Al-Mansur did not follow his own law very closely, bringing dhimmis back to the caliphate's treasury due to the needed expertise of dhimmis in the area of finance. Al-Mutawakkil followed the law banning dhimmis from public office more seriously, although, soon after his reign, many of the laws concerning dhimmis participating in government were completely unobserved or at least less strictly observed. Even Al-Muqtadir, who held a similar stance as al-Mutawakkil on barring non-Muslims from public office, himself had multiple Christian secretaries, indicating that non-Muslims still had access to many of the most important figures within the caliphate. Past having a casual association or just being a secretary to high-ranking Islamic officials, some of them achieved the second highest office after the caliph: the vizier.

Jews and Christians may have had a lower overall status compared to Muslims in the Abbasid Caliphate, but dhimmis were often allowed to hold respectable and even prestigious occupations in some cases, such as doctors and public officeholders. Jews and Christians were also allowed to be rich even if they were taxed for being a dhimmi. Dhimmis were capable of moving up and down the social ladder, though this largely depended on the particular caliph. An indication as to the social standing of Jews and Christians at the time was their ability to live next to Muslim people. While al-Mansur was ruling the caliphate, for instance, it was not uncommon for dhimmis to live in the same neighborhoods as Muslims. One of the biggest reasons why dhimmis were allowed to hold prestigious jobs and positions in government is that they were generally important to the well-being of the state and were proficient to excellent with the work at hand. Some Muslims in the caliphate took offense to the idea that there were dhimmis in public offices who were in a way ruling over them although it was an Islamic state, while other Muslims were at time jealous of some dhimmis for having a level of wealth or prestige greater than other Muslims, even if Muslims were still the majority of the ruling class. In general, Muslims, Jews, and Christians had close relations that could be considered positive at times, especially for Jews, in contrast to how Jews were being treated in Europe.

Many of the laws and restrictions that were imposed on dhimmis often resembled other laws that previous states had used to discriminate against a minority religion, specifically Jewish people. Romans in the fourth century banned Jewish people from holding public offices, banned Roman citizens from converting to Judaism, and often demoted Jews who were serving in the Roman military. In direct contrast, there was an event in which two viziers, Ibn al-Furat and Ali ibn Isa ibn al-Jarrah, argued about Ibn al-Furat's decision to make a Christian the head of the military. A previous vizier, Abu Muhammad al-Hasan al-Bazuri, had done so. These laws predated al-Mansur's laws against dhimmis and often had similar restrictions, although Roman emperors were often much more strict on enforcing these laws than many Abbasid caliphs.

Most of Baghdad's Jews were incorporated into the Arab community and considered Arabic their native language. Some Jews studied Hebrew in their schools and Jewish religious education flourished. The united Muslim empire allowed Jews to reconstruct links between their dispersed communities throughout the Middle East. The city's Talmudic institute helped spread the rabbinical tradition to Europe, and the Jewish community in Baghdad went on to establish ten rabbinical schools and twenty-three synagogues. Baghdad not only contained the tombs of Muslim saints and martyrs, but also the tomb of Yusha, whose corpse had been brought to Iraq during the first migration of the Jews out of the Levant.

Arabization
While the Abbasids originally gained power by exploiting the social inequalities against non-Arabs in the Umayyad Empire, during Abbasid rule the empire rapidly Arabized, particularly in the Fertile Crescent region (namely Mesopotamia and the Levant) as had begun under Umayyad rule. As knowledge was shared in the Arabic language throughout the empire, many people from different nationalities and religions began to speak Arabic in their everyday lives. Resources from other languages began to be translated into Arabic, and a unique Islamic identity began to form that fused previous cultures with Arab culture, creating a level of civilization and knowledge that was considered a marvel in Europe at the time.

Holidays
There were large feasts on certain days, as the Muslims of the empire celebrated Christian holidays as well as their own. There were two main Islamic feasts: one marked by the end of Ramadan; the other, "the Feast of Sacrifice". The former was especially joyful because children would purchase decorations and sweetmeats; people prepared the best food and bought new clothes. At midmorning, the caliph, wearing Muhammad's thobe, would guide officials, accompanied by armed soldiers to the Great Mosque, where he led prayers. After the prayer, all those in attendance would exchange the best wishes and hug their kin and companions. The festivities lasted for three days. During those limited number of nights, the palaces were lit up and boats on the Tigris hung lights. It was said that Baghdad "glittered ‘like a bride." During "the Feast of Sacrifice.", sheep were butchered in public arenas and the caliph participated in a large-scale sacrifice in the palace courtyard. Afterward, the meat would be divided and given to the poor.

In addition to these two holidays, Shias celebrated the birthdays of Fatimah and Ali ibn Abi Talib. Matrimonies and births in the royal family were observed by all in the empire. The announcement that one of the caliph's sons could recite the Koran smoothly was greeted by communal jubilation. When Harun developed this holy talent, the people lit torches and decorated the streets with wreaths of flowers, and his father, Al-Mahdi, freed 500 slaves.

Of all the holidays imported from other cultures and religions, the one most celebrated in Baghdad (a city with many Persians) was Nowruz, which celebrated the arrival of spring. In a ceremonial ablution introduced by Persian troops, residents sprinkled themselves with water and ate almond cakes. The palaces of the imperial family were lit up for six days and nights. The Abbasids also celebrated the Persian holiday of Mihraj, which marked the onset of winter (signified with pounding drums), and Sadar, when homes burned incense and the masses would congregate along the Tigris to witness princes and viziers pass by.

Military

In Baghdad there were many Abbasid military leaders who were or said they were of Arab descent. However, it is clear that most of the ranks were of Iranian origin, the vast majority being from Khorasan and Transoxiana, not from western Iran or Azerbaijan. Most of the Khorasani soldiers who brought the Abbasids to power were Arabs.

The standing army of the Muslims in Khorosan was overwhelmingly Arab. The unit organization of the Abbasids was designed with the goal of ethnic and racial equality among supporters. When Abu Muslim recruited officers along the Silk Road, he registered them based not on their tribal or ethno-national affiliations but on their current places of residence. Under the Abbasids, Iranian peoples became better represented in the army and bureaucracy as compared to before. The Abbasid army was centred on the Khurasan Abna al-dawla infantry and the Khurasaniyya heavy cavalry, led by their own semi-autonomous commanders (qa'id) who recruited and deployed their own men with Abbasid resource grants. al-Mu‘tasim began the practice of recruiting Turkic slave soldiers from the Samanids into a private army, which allowed him to take over the reins of the caliphate. He abolished the old jund system created by Umar and diverted the salaries of the original Arab military descendants to the Turkic slave soldiers. The Turkic soldiers transformed the style of warfare, as they were known as capable horse archers, trained from childhood to ride. This military was now drafted from the ethnic groups of the faraway borderlands, and were completely separate from the rest of society. Some could not speak Arabic properly. This led to the decline of the caliphate starting with the Anarchy at Samarra.

Although the Abbasids never retained a substantial regular army, the caliph could recruit a considerable number of soldiers in a short time when needed from levies. There were also cohorts of regular troops who received steady pay and a special forces unit. At any moment, 125,000 Muslim soldiers could be assembled along the Byzantine frontier, Baghdad, Medina, Damascus, Rayy, and other geostrategic locations in order to quell any unrest.

The cavalry was entirely covered in iron, with helmets. Similar to medieval knights, their only exposed spots were the end of their noses and small openings in front of their eyes. Their foot soldiers were issued spears, swords, and pikes, and (in line with Persian fashion) trained to stand so solidly that, one contemporary wrote "you would have thought them held fast by clamps of bronze."

The Abbasid army amassed an array of siege equipment, such as catapults, mangonels, battering rams, ladders, grappling irons, and hooks. All such weaponry was operated by military engineers. However, the primary siege weapon was the manjaniq, a type of siege weapon that was comparable to the trebuchet employed in Western medieval times. From the seventh century onward, it had largely replaced torsion artillery. By Harun al-Rashid's time, the Abbasid army employed fire grenades. The Abbasids also utilized field hospitals and ambulances drawn by camels.

Civil administration

As a result of such a vast Empire, the caliphate was decentralized and divided into 24 provinces.

In keeping with Persian tradition, Harun's vizier enjoyed close to unchecked powers. Under Harun, a special "bureau of confiscation" was created. This governmental wing made it possible for the vizier to seize the property and riches of any corrupt governor or civil servant. In addition, it allowed governors to confiscate the estates of lower-ranking officials. Finally, the caliph could impose the same penalty on a vizier who fell from grace. As one later caliph put it: "The vizier is our representative throughout the land and amongst our subjects. Therefore, he who obeys him obeys us; and he who obeys us obeys God, and God shall cause him who obeys Him to enter paradise."

Every regional metropolis had a post office and hundreds of roads were paved in order to link the imperial capital with other cities and towns. The empire employed a system of relays to deliver mail. The central post office in Baghdad even had a map with directions that noted the distances between each town. The roads were provided with roadside inns, hospices, and wells and could reach eastward through Persia and Central Asia, to as far as China. The post office not only enhanced civil services but also served as intelligence for the caliph. Mailmen were employed as spies who kept an eye on local affairs.

Early in the days of the caliphate, the Barmakids took the responsibility of shaping the civil service. The family had roots in a Buddhist monastery in northern Afghanistan. In the early 8th century, the family converted to Islam and began to take on a sizable part of the civil administration for the Abbasids.

Capital poured into the caliphate's treasury from a variety of taxes, including a real estate tax; a levy on cattle, gold and silver, and commercial wares; a special tax on non-Muslims; and customs dues.

Trade
Under Harun, maritime trade through the Persian Gulf thrived, with Arab vessels trading as far south as Madagascar and as far east as China, Korea, and Japan. The growing economy of Baghdad and other cities inevitably led to the demand for luxury items and formed a class of entrepreneurs who organized long-range caravans for the trade and then the distribution of their goods. A whole section in the East Baghdad suq was dedicated to Chinese goods. Arabs traded with the Baltic region and made it as far north as the British Isles. Tens of thousands of Arab coins have been discovered in parts of Russia and Sweden, which bear witness to the comprehensive trade networks set up by the Abbasids. King Offa of Mercia (in England) minted gold coins similar to those of the Abbasids in the eighth century.

Muslim merchants employed ports in Bandar Siraf, Basra, and Aden and some Red Sea ports to travel and trade with India and South East Asia. Land routes were also utilized through Central Asia. Arab businessmen were present in China as early as the eighth century. Arab merchants sailed the Caspian Sea to reach and trade with Bukhara and Samarkand.

Many caravans and goods never made it to their intended destinations. Some Chinese exports perished in fires, while other ships sank. It was said that anybody who made it to China and back unharmed was blessed by God. Common sea routes were also plagued by pirates who built and crewed vessels that were faster than most merchant ships. It is said that many of the adventures at sea in the Sinbad tales were based on historical fiction of mariners of the day.

The Arabs also established overland trade with Africa, largely for gold and slaves. When trade with Europe ceased due to hostilities, Jews served as a link between the two hostile worlds.

Decline

Abbasids found themselves at odds with the Shia Muslims, most of whom had supported their war against the Umayyads since the Abbasids and the Shias claimed legitimacy by their familial connection to Muhammad. Once in power, the Abbasids disavowed any support for Shia beliefs in favor of Sunni Islam. Shortly thereafter, Berber Kharijites set up an independent state in North Africa in 801. Within 50 years, the Idrisids in the Maghreb and Aghlabids of Ifriqiya and soon the Tulunids and Ikshidids of Misr were effectively independent in Africa. The Abbasid authority began to deteriorate during the reign of al-Radi when their Turkic Army generals, who already had de facto independence, stopped paying the caliphate. Even provinces close to Baghdad began to seek local dynastic rule. Also, the Abbasids found themselves to be often at conflict with the Umayyads in Spain. The Abbasid financial position weakened as well, with tax revenues from the Sawād decreasing in the 9th and the 10th centuries.

Separatist dynasties and their successors
The following list represents the succession of Islamic dynasties that emerged from the fractured Abbasid empire by their general geographic location. Dynasties often overlap, where a vassal emir revolted from and later conquered his lord. Gaps appear during periods of contest where the dominating power was unclear. Except for the Fatimid Caliphate in Egypt, recognizing a Shia succession through Ali, and the Andalusian Caliphates of the Umayyads and Almohads, every Muslim dynasty at least acknowledged the nominal suzerainty of the Abbasids as Caliph and Commander of the Faithful.

 (Maghrib al Aqsa or Extreme Maghreb) Morocco: Idrisids (788–974) → Almoravids (1040–1147) → Almohads (1120–1269) → Marinids (1472–1554) → Wattasids (1472–1554) → Saadis (1510–1659) → 'Alawi dynasty
 Ifriqiya (modern Tunisia, eastern Algeria and western Libya): Aghlabids (800–909 CE) → Fatimids (temporaly in Kairouan) (909–973 CE) → Zirids (at their collapse) (973–1148) → Almohads (1148–1229) → Hafsids (1229–1574) → Husainid dynasty (1705–1957) → Kingdom of Tunisia
 Egypt and Palestine: Tulunids (868–905 CE) → Ikhshidids (935–969) → Fatimid Caliphate (909–1171) → Ayyubid dynasty (1171–1250) → Mamluks (1250–1517)
 Al-Jazira (modern East Syria and Western Iraq): Hamdanids (890–1004 CE) → Marwanids (990–1085) and Uqaylids (990–1096) → Seljuks (1034–1194) → Mongol Empire and the Ilkhanate (1231–1335)
 Southwest Iran: Buyids (934–1055) → Seljuks (1034–1194) → Mongol Empire → Injuids (1335–1357) → Muzaffarids (1314–1393)
 Khorasan (modern Iran, Afghanistan and Turkmenistan): Tahirids (821–873) → Saffarids (873–903) → Samanids (903–995) → Ghaznavids (995–1038) → Seljuks (1038–1194) → Ghurids (1011–1215) → Khwarazmians (1077–1231) → Mongol Empire and the Ilkhanate (1231–1335)
 Transoxiana (modern Central Asia): Samanids (819–999) → Karakhanids (840–1212) → Khwarazmians (1077–1231) → Mongol Empire and the Chagatai Khanate (1225–1687)
(Maghrib al Awsat or Central Maghreb) Algeria: Emirate of Tlemcen → Sulaymanids Dynasty → Rustamids → Zirid dynasty (apogee) → Ifranid dynasty → Abd al-Mu'min (Almohad founder from Nedroma) → Zayyanid dynasty and Marinid dynasty (from Zibans in Algeria) → Sultanate of Tuggurt → Kingdom of Beni Abbas → Kingdom of Kuku → Emirate of Abdelkader
Indus Valley: Habbari dynasty (841–1025) and Emirate of Multan (855–1010) → Ghaznavid Empire (995–1038)

Dynasties claiming Abbasid descent
Centuries after the Abbasids fall, several dynasties have claimed descent from them, as "claiming kinship relation with Muhammad", that is, claiming an affiliation to the 'People of the House' or the status of a sayyid or sharif, has arguably been the most widespread way in Muslim societies of supporting one's moral or material objectives with genealogical credentials." Such claims of continuity with Muhammad or his Hashemite kin such as the Abbasids foster a sense of "political viability" for a candidate dynasty, with the intention of "serving an internal audience" (or in other words, gaining legitimacy in the view of the masses). The Wadai Empire which ruled parts of modern-day Sudan also claimed Abbasid descent, alongside the Khairpur and Bahawalpur states in Pakistan and the Khanate of Bastak.

A common trope among Abbasid claimant dynasties is that they are descended from Abbasid princes of Baghdad, "dispersed" by the Mongol invasion in 1258 CE. These surviving princes would leave Baghdad for a safe haven not controlled by the Mongols, assimilate to their new societies, and their descendants would grow to establish their own dynasties with their Abbasid 'credentials' centuries later. This is highlighted by the origin myth of the Bastak khanate which relates that in 656 AH/1258 CE, the year of the fall of Baghdad, and following the sack of the city, a few surviving members of the Abbasid dynastic family led by the eldest amongst them, Ismail II son of Hamza son of Ahmed son of Mohamed migrated to Southern Iran, in the village of Khonj and later to Bastak where their khanate was established in the 17th century CE.

Meanwhile, the Wadai Empire related a similar origin story, claiming descent from a man by the name of Salih ibn Abdullah ibn Abbas, whose father Abdullah was an Abbasid prince who fled Baghdad for Hijaz upon the Mongol invasion. He had a son named Salih who would grow to become an "able jurist" and a "very devout man". The Muslim ulama on pilgrimage in Mecca met him and, impressed by his knowledge, invited him to return with him to Sennar. Seeing the population's deviation from Islam, he "pushed further" until he found the Abu Sinun mountain in Wadai where he converted the local people to Islam and taught them its rules, after which they made him sultan, thus laying the foundations of the Wadai Empire.

With regards to the Bastak khanate, Shaikh Mohamed Khan Bastaki was the first Abbasid ruler of Bastak to hold the title of "Khan" after the local people accepted him as a ruler (Persian: خان, Arabic: الحاكم), meaning "ruler" or "king", a title which was reportedly bestowed upon him by Karim Khan Zand. The title then became that of all the subsequent Abbasid rulers of Bastak and Jahangiriyeh, and also collectively refers in plural form – i.e., "Khans" (Persian: خوانين) – to the descendants of Shaikh Mohamed Khan Bastaki. The last Abbasid ruler of Bastak and Jahangiriyeh was Mohamed A’zam Khan Baniabbassian son of Mohamed Reza Khan "Satvat al-Mamalek" Baniabbasi. He authored the book Tarikh-e Jahangiriyeh va Baniabbassian-e Bastak (1960), in which is recounted the history of the region and the Abbasid family that ruled it. Mohamed A’zam Khan Baniabbassian died in 1967, regarded as the end of the Abbasid reign in Bastak.

See also

References

Notes

Citations

Sources

External links

 
 .
 .

|-

|-

 
Arab dynasties
Muslim dynasties
Former countries in Asia
Countries in medieval Africa
States in medieval Anatolia
Former countries in Europe
Iraq under the Abbasid Caliphate
History of Saudi Arabia
History of Pakistan
Medieval history of Iran
States and territories established in the 750s
States and territories disestablished in 1258
States and territories established in 1261
States and territories disestablished in 1517
750 establishments
1510s disestablishments in Asia
8th-century establishments in Africa
1258 disestablishments in Asia
13th-century disestablishments in Africa
Historical transcontinental empires
Caliphates
Former empires
Former monarchies